William Poulett may refer to:

 William Poulett, 6th Earl Poulett (1827–1899), English peer, landowner, army officer, and racehorse owner
 William Poulett, 7th Earl Poulett (1883–1918), English peer and British Army officer

See also 
 William Paulet (disambiguation)